Boeuf Township is an inactive township in Franklin County, in the U.S. state of Missouri.

Boeuf Township was established in 1819, taking its name from Boeuf Creek.

References

Townships in Missouri
Townships in Franklin County, Missouri